Nick Hendrix (born 19 March 1985) is an English actor, best known for his role as Detective Sergeant Jamie Winter in the ITV police detective show Midsomer Murders.

Early life and education 

Hendrix was born in Ascot, Berkshire. He grew up in Eton, near Windsor. Hendrix is the nephew of former ITV newscaster Alastair Stewart.  

Hendrix earned a BA in drama at the University of Exeter. He graduated from the Royal Academy of Dramatic Art (RADA) with a BA in acting in 2010.

Personal life 
Hendrix has been married to actress Jessica Ellerby since July 2017.

Stage and theatre 

Hendrix appeared in several productions whilst training at RADA, including: Company, Measure for Measure, Alcestis, The Recruiting Officer, Look Homeward, Angel, Macbeth, and The White Stocking.

Filmography

Television

Film

Other works 
 Our Kind of Cruelty by Araminta Hall – narrator of Audible audiobook, along with Eleanor Matsuura

References

External links 
 
 Nick Hendrix on Instagram (verified account)
 Nick Hendrix on Twitter (verified account)

1985 births
21st-century English male actors
English male television actors
Living people
Male actors from Berkshire
People from Ascot, Berkshire